The 2015 Northern Chile floods were a series of mudflows that affected much of northern Chile, product of flash floods from different rivers due to unseasonal heavy rains in the area, causing severe damage in several towns of the Antofagasta, Atacama and Coquimbo regions.
Flooding in Chile and Peru resulted from an unusual cold front which moved across the Andes, bringing heavy rainfall to the region.

The National Office of Emergency of the Interior Ministry (ONEMI) has reported more than 27,413 people affected, 5,585 people on shelters and more than 300 isolated due to roads destruction.
26 people died during the mudflow and 101 are officially missing, although it is expected that these numbers will increase as contact is reestablished with remote communities.
Preliminary figures show that property damage reaches more than 28,000 houses, of those 105 are completely destroyed, and at least 5,900 present severe damages.

State of emergency

On March 25, near the 17:00 (UTC 3) hours, and due to the serious events due to flooding, the president of Chile, Michelle Bachelet declared Constitutional State of Exception Catastrophe throughout the Region of Atacama, where about 320,000 people, mainly settled in the cities of Copiapó and reside Vallenar. This state means that the Armed Forces of Chile take control of the area to protect and maintain public order in the affected area. The officer in charge is Chief Lieutenant Colonel Marcel Urrutia Caro, belonging to the Army Chile. Hours later a state of emergency was extended to the city of Antofagasta.

President Michelle Bachelet is in the areas affected by floods since March 25. Chañaral visited on March 26, and that same day was decreed curfew across the Atacama region since 23:00 to 6:00 hours (UTC −3) . The March 26 were deployed Marines in Chañaral to contain looting registered in some shops during the day.

The authorities and citizens reported cases of speculation and hoarding of food and staples. The government announced a lawsuit against those conducting unjustified price increases, and in supermarkets and service stations rationed the sale of certain products and fuels. In La Serena and Coquimbo the stock of bottled water scarcity product sold out due to problems in processing water Elqui river.

The Chilean Navy sent to the port of Chañaral the Rancagua and Chacabuco barges emergency vehicles, supplies and Marines, along with the ship Sergeant Aldea. The government allocated 1.1 billion Chilean peso for the reconstruction.

See also
1991 Antofagasta mudflows
2002 Northern Chile floods and mudflow
Mudflow
Flash flood
Emergency Response Coordination Centre (ERCC) –ECHO Daily Map 27/3/2015: Chile floods

References

External links
1 April 2015 flooding video, CBC News.

2015 floods in South America
Floods in Chile
2015 in Chile
2015 meteorology
Landslides in Chile
Landslides in 2015
March 2015 events in South America
Weather events in Chile